The 2021 EUBC Youth European Boxing Championships were held in Budva, Montenegro from 15 to 23 October 2021.

To attend in the EUBC European Confederation Youth Boxing Championships were eligible boxers who were born in 2003 and in 2004.

The event was introduced also the new youth weight categories, the girls can attend in 12 while the boys in 13 different weight classes in Montenegro. The 48kg, 50kg, 52kg, 54kg, 57kg, 60kg, 63kg, 66kg, 70kg, 75kg, 81kg and +81kg were official for the women’s youth boxers in Budva. The men’s youth boxers could attend at the 48kg, 51kg, 54kg, 57kg, 60kg, 63.5kg, 67kg, 71kg, 75kg, 80kg, 86kg, 92kg and +92kg weight categories.

Schedule 
Source:

Number of Entries by Team 
Source:

Medalists

Medal table

Draws

Men's

Minimumweight (48kg)

Flyweight (51kg)

Bantamweight (54kg)

Featherweight (57kg)

Lightweight (60kg)

Light Welterweight (63.5kg)

Welterweight (67kg)

Light Middleweight (71kg)

Middleweight (75kg)

Light Heavyweight (80kg)

Cruiserweight (86g)

Heavyweight (92kg)

Super Heavyweight (+92kg)

Women's

Minimumweight (48kg)

Light Flyweight (50kg)

Flyweight (52kg)

Bantamweight (54kg)

Featherweight (57kg)

Lightweight (60kg)

Light Welterweight (63kg)

Welterweight (66kg)

Light Middleweight (70kg)

Middleweight (75kg)

Light Heavyweight (81kg)

Heavyweight (+81kg)

References

External links 
 Final sheets

EUBC Youth European Boxing Championships
EUBC Youth European Boxing Championships
EUBC Youth European Boxing Championships